Kaarlo "Kalle" Kustaa Lappalainen (30 September 1877 – 9 May 1965) was a Finnish sport shooter who competed in the 1920 Summer Olympics.

In 1920 he won the silver medal as member of the Finnish team in the team running deer, single shots event and the bronze medal in the team 300 metre military rifle, prone competition. In the 1920 Summer Olympics he also participated in the following events:

 Team free rifle - fourth place
 Team 300 metre military rifle, standing - seventh place
 Team 600 metre military rifle, prone - eighth place
 Team 300 and 600 metre military rifle, prone - tenth place
 300 metre free rifle, three positions - place unknown

References

External links
profile

1877 births
1965 deaths
People from Juankoski
People from Kuopio Province (Grand Duchy of Finland)
Finnish male sport shooters
ISSF rifle shooters
Running target shooters
Olympic shooters of Finland
Shooters at the 1920 Summer Olympics
Olympic silver medalists for Finland
Olympic bronze medalists for Finland
Olympic medalists in shooting
Medalists at the 1920 Summer Olympics
Sportspeople from North Savo